U.S. Post Office in San Pedro, California is a historic Streamline Moderne post office built in 1936. Designed by supervising architect Louis A. Simon with architects Gordon Kaufmann and W. Horace Austin, the San Pedro Post Office was listed in the National Register of Historic Places in 1985. The building also formerly served as a U.S. Customs Office. The building's use of marble, bronze and milk glass are typical of 1930s architecture for U.S. government buildings.  The floor tile is laid in a basketweave pattern surrounded by black marble, giving the effect of rugs on a marble floor.  Some of the original bronze lamps and ink wells are still intact at the public writing desks. The Section of Painting and Sculpture commissioned Fletcher Martin to create the post office mural, titled Mail Transportation (1938).

See also 
 List of Registered Historic Places in Los Angeles
 List of Los Angeles Historic-Cultural Monuments in the Harbor area
 List of United States post offices

References

External links 

 San Pedro Chamber of Commerce: San Pedro Post Office building
 "Time stands still at the San Pedro Post Office"— South Bay History (blog), May 23, 2015

San Pedro
Los Angeles Historic-Cultural Monuments
Government buildings completed in 1935
Art Deco architecture in California
Streamline Moderne architecture in California
San Pedro, Los Angeles